Channel i Music Awards is a musical award annually given by Channel i. It has been given 12 times every year from 2006. On 1 October 2017, The award's 12th edition took place where musicians were awarded in 18 categories. Khurshid Alam was awarded lifetime achievement award and Ali Hossain, Alauddin Ali and Alam Khan were awarded with special honor for their lifetime contribution to music. 13th at 2018, 14th at 2019, 15th at 2020 & 16th at 2021 channel i music awards also completed successfully. In 15th channel i music awards 2020, popular pop singer Ferdous Wahid awarded lifetime achievement award. Popular folk singer Sayera Reza was awarded as the best folk singer for the song Dosh Dibona Penned by Anurup Aich & Composed by JK Majlish and popular music director JK Majlish Was awarded as the best music director (modern) in the same year, for the song Baroti Mashe from the album pagli suraiya sang by sania sultana liza

Categories

Critics awards
Best Rabindra Sangeet Singer
Best Nazrul Sangeet Singer
Best People's Song: Shofi Mondol
Best Modern Singer
Best Novice Singer
Best Music director
Best lyricist: Asif Iqbal
Best Music video: Tanim Rahman Angshu
Best Cover Design
Best Sound Engineer
Best Classical Music Singer
Best Band
Best Playback Singer

Popular choice awards
Best Modern Singer
Best Novice Singer
Best Band
Best Playback Singer
Best Music Video

Events
1st Channel i Music Awards - 2006
2nd Channel i Music Awards - 2007
3rd Channel i Music Awards - 2008
4th Channel i Music Awards - 2009
5th Channel i Music Awards - 2010
6th Channel i Music Awards - 2011
7th Channel i Music Awards - 2012
8th Channel i Music Awards - 2013
9th Channel i Music Awards - 2014
10th Channel i Music Awards - 2015
11th Channel i Music Awards - 2016
12th Channel i Music Awards - 2017
13th Channel i Music Awards - 2018
14th Channel i Music Awards - 2019
15th Channel i Music Awards - 2020
16th Channel i Music Awards - 2021
17th Channel i Music Awards - 2022

References

Bangladeshi music awards
Channel i original programming